The 2013 European Athletics Indoor Championships were held at Scandinavium and Svenska Mässan in Gothenburg, Sweden, on 1–3 March 2013.

Bidding process
The decision to grant the event for Gothenburg was made by the European Athletics Council at their long meeting in Malta on October 15, 2007. Initially, Gothenburg applied for the 2011 Championships against Paris. The European Athletic Association thought the two cities presented very good concepts, and it ended up with the two candidates get one championship each; Paris in 2011 and Gothenburg in 2013. Gothenburg will use the concept All under one roof.

Venue

The main venue for the 2013 European Athletics Indoor Championships will be Scandinavium with a maximum capacity of 12,000 spectators, but at the event the arena will have about 6,500 spectators because of the reconstruction. Prior to the championships, the arena floor will be raised 3 metres and be equipped with running tracks. In Svenska Mässan, next to Scandinavium, there will be a Market Square, where various activities will be organized during the competitions. All the victory ceremonies will take place in the Market Square during the evenings. The shot put qualifications will also be held at a special shot put venue in Svenska Mässan. The host city Gothenburg has organized several championships in athletics before. In 1974 and 1984, Scandinavium hosted the European Indoor Championships. Moreover, nearby Ullevi Stadium has staged the 1995 World Championships in Athletics and the 2006 European Athletics Championships. Last time Sweden hosted the European Indoor Championships was in 1996 when Ericsson Globe in Stockholm held the event.

Men's results

Track

* Pavel Trenikhin was originally disqualified, but was reinstated upon appeal.
** Great Britain were originally disqualified, but were reinstated upon appeal.

Field

Combined

Women's results

Track

Field

Combined

Medal table

Participating nations
A total of 577 athletes from 47 countries has participated in the championships.

  (3)
  (1)
  (2)
  (5)
  (2)
  (12)
  (13)
  (2)
  (13)
  (8)
  (4)
  (21)
  (6)
  (7)
  (11)
  (32)
  (3)
  (28)
  (2)
  (29)
 
  (7)
  (2)
  (11)
  (2)
  (40)
  (10)
  (4)
  (1)
  (1)
  (1)
  (1)
  (13)
  (12)
  (21)
  (13)
  (18)
  (51)
  (1)
  (4)
  (11)
  (7)
  (26)
  (40) (Host)
  (6)
  (15)
  (38)

In brackets: Squad size

Broadcasting
TV4 in Sweden is the host broadcaster of the 2013 European Athletics Indoor Championships.

References

External links

 
 EAA competition website

 
European Athletics Indoor Championships
International athletics competitions hosted by Sweden
European Athletics Indoor Championships)
European Athletics Indoor Championships
International sports competitions in Gothenburg
March 2013 sports events in Europe
2010s in Gothenburg
Athletics in Gothenburg